Frederick Ellison "Fritz" Bastian (February 11, 1898 – February 28, 1944) was an American tennis player.

Biography
He was born February 11, 1898, Indianapolis, Indiana.

Bastian, a one-time runner-up in the National Junior tennis championship, won singles titles in 1917 and 1919 at the Tri-State Tennis Tournament (now Cincinnati Masters). In winning the 1919 title, Bastian upset U.S. Davis Cup player John Hennessey in the final, 2–6, 6–4, 6–1, 6–4.

Bastian also won a doubles title at Cincinnati (1920, with Hennessey), and was a doubles finalist in 1917 and 1919.

Bastian attended Indiana University, where he won the Big Ten and national intercollegiate men's singles titles in 1921.

He died on February 28, 1944.

References

External links
 Big Ten tennis champions, 1910–2004 (PDF file)

1898 births
1944 deaths
American male tennis players
Indiana Hoosiers men's tennis players
Tennis players from Indianapolis